Joseph Lucien Guy Rousseau (December 21, 1934 – November 23, 2016) was a Canadian professional ice hockey forward. Rousseau mainly played in the minor leagues during his career, though he also played four games in the National Hockey League for the Montreal Canadiens. In 1967, he served as the Executive Director of the Canada Winter Games in Quebec City. Guy is the brother of Rollie and Bobby Rousseau.

References

External links

1934 births
2016 deaths
Canadian ice hockey forwards
Cleveland Barons (1937–1973) players
Montreal Canadiens players
Quebec Aces (AHL) players
Rochester Americans players
Ice hockey people from Montreal